Ropivacaine (rINN)  is a local anaesthetic drug belonging to the amino amide group. The name ropivacaine refers to both the racemate and the marketed S-enantiomer. Ropivacaine hydrochloride is commonly marketed by AstraZeneca under the brand name Naropin.

History
Ropivacaine was developed after bupivacaine was noted to be associated with cardiac arrest, particularly in pregnant women. Ropivacaine was found to have less cardiotoxicity than bupivacaine in animal models.

Clinical use

Contraindications
Ropivacaine is contraindicated for intravenous regional anaesthesia (IVRA). However, new data suggested both ropivacaine (1.2-1.8 mg/kg in 40ml) and levobupivacaine (40 ml of 0.125% solution) can be used, because they have less cardiovascular and central nervous system toxicity than racemic bupivacaine.

Adverse effects
Adverse drug reactions (ADRs) are rare when it is administered correctly. Most ADRs relate to administration technique (resulting in systemic exposure) or pharmacological effects of anesthesia, however allergic reactions can rarely occur.

Systemic exposure to excessive quantities of ropivacaine mainly result in central nervous system (CNS) and cardiovascular effects – CNS effects usually occur at lower blood plasma concentrations and additional cardiovascular effects present at higher concentrations, though cardiovascular collapse may also occur with low concentrations. CNS effects may include CNS excitation (nervousness, tingling around the mouth, tinnitus, tremor, dizziness, blurred vision, seizures followed by depression (drowsiness, loss of consciousness), respiratory depression and apnea). Cardiovascular effects include hypotension, bradycardia, arrhythmias, and/or cardiac arrest – some of which may be due to hypoxemia secondary to respiratory depression.

Postarthroscopic glenohumeral chondrolysis
Ropivacaine is toxic to cartilage and their intra-articular infusions can lead to Postarthroscopic glenohumeral chondrolysis.

Treatment of overdose
As for bupivacaine, Celepid, a commonly available intravenous lipid emulsion, can be effective in treating severe cardiotoxicity secondary to local anaesthetic overdose in animal experiments and in humans in a process called lipid rescue.

References

External links 
 
 

Local anesthetics
Obstetrics
Piperidines
AstraZeneca brands
Anilides